International Hospitals Group (IHG) is an international healthcare services company headquartered in Denham, Buckinghamshire. IHG's services include: on an individual or turnkey basis; healthcare consultancy, design, construction, medical equipping and operation and management of healthcare facilities, worldwide.

Company Insight

IHG, as an established British exporter, founded in 1972. IHG has completed over 480 healthcare projects in 55 countries with clients including; the United Nations, the World Bank, the International Finance Corporation and over 24 governments.

Areas of activity

Feasibility Studies and Advisory Services
Functional Planning and Design
Construction and Project Management
Medical Equipping
Commissioning Services
Operational Management and Training
Accreditation and Quality Assurance Programmes

References

Health care companies of the United Kingdom